"Take a Chance on Me" is a song by Swedish pop group ABBA, released in January 1978 as the second single from their fifth studio album, ABBA: The Album (1977). Agnetha Fältskog and Anni-Frid Lyngstad share the lead vocals on the verses and choruses, with Fältskog singing two bridge sections solo.
It reached the top ten in both the UK and US. The song was notably covered by the British band Erasure.

Background and release
The working title of "Take a Chance on Me" was "Billy Boy". (An excerpt of “Billy Boy” was released on the 1994 box set Thank You for the Music, as part of the track ABBA Undeleted, which consisted of demos, early and alternate versions of completed songs, and unfinished songs.) Written and recorded in 1977 by Benny Andersson and Björn Ulvaeus, the song was one of ABBA's first singles in which their manager Stig Anderson did not assist with writing the lyrics, confirming Andersson and Ulvaeus as a songwriting partnership.

The song's origins sprang from Ulvaeus, a keen runner, who would repeat a "tck-a-ch"-style rhythm to pace himself. This evolved into "take-a-chance" and the eventual lyrics. Roger Palm, the drummer on the track, described the song as "ABBA at their most energetic and forceful".

The single's B-side was "I'm a Marionette", which, like "Thank You for the Music" and "I Wonder (Departure)" (the B-side to their previous single, "The Name of the Game"), was part of a mini-musical entitled The Girl With the Golden Hair performed during their 1977 concert tour.

Reception
Billboard described "Take a Chance on Me" as "one of [ABBA's] most busy, fast paced productions."  Cash Box said that the vocals "are intricately arranged to produce a wall of sound." Record World called it a "pleasing tune,
very well arranged" with "one of pop's most captivating acappella openings since Blue Swede tackled 'Hooked On A Feeling.'" 

"Take a Chance on Me" proved to be one of ABBA's most successful chart hits, becoming the group's seventh UK #1 (and third consecutive chart-topper in the country after "Knowing Me, Knowing You" and "The Name of the Game"). It was also ABBA's final #1 in the UK of the 1970s, and gives the group the distinction of being the act with the most chart-topping singles of the 1970s in the UK. It sold over 500,000 copies and was awarded a gold disc. As of September 2021, it is the group's fourth-biggest song in the country with 950,000 chart sales (including 882,000 pure sales).

In the United States it reached #3 and was certified gold for one million sales. The song peaked at #3 in Canada and West Germany as well.

"Take a Chance on Me" has been widely regarded as one of ABBA's finest songs. In 2017, Billboard ranked the song number two on their list of the 15 greatest ABBA songs, and in 2021, Rolling Stone ranked the song number nine on their list of the 25 greatest ABBA songs.

Personnel
 Agnetha Fältskog – vocals
 Anni-Frid Lyngstad – vocals
 Björn Ulvaeus – acoustic guitar, electric guitar, vocals
 Benny Andersson – keyboards, synthesizers, vocals

Additional musicians
 Rutger Gunnarsson – bass
 Roger Palm – drums
 Malando Gassama – percussion

Charts

Weekly charts

Year-end charts

Certifications and sales

</ref>}}

Erasure version

The track was covered by English synthpop duo Erasure in 1992 as part of their Abba-esque EP with an additional ragga-style toast performed by MC Kinky added to the song. In a few countries, the cover was credited to "Erasure featuring Special K", due to MC Kinky referring to herself as "Special K" during the ragga rap. In the United States, it reached number 51 on the Billboard Hot 100 Airplay chart. Although it had earned enough charting points to reach the publication's main Hot 100 chart, it was not eligible to enter as it had not been released commercially as a single. The radio edit omits the ragga rap.

Critical reception
Larry Flick from Billboard wrote, "Track maintains the cool kitsch of the original, while giving it electro-hip instrumentation and a jolting-but-pleasing toast interlude by MC Kinky. A must for adventurous popsters, while remixes have considerable club potential." Amy Linden from Entertainment Weekly found that Erasure "reverently tarts up" the song "as keyboard whiz Vince Clarke pumps the '70s gems full of '92 club aggression." She also stated that the duo "pay respect with a frothy testimonial that has its tongue in the right place." Tom Ewing of Freaky Trigger noted that the whole project "roars to life exactly once, when MC Kinky takes over for thirty delightful, crass seconds in the middle of "Take a Chance on Me" and shows the song a little creative disrespect at last." Dave Sholin from the Gavin Report asked, "ABBA goes techno?", and concluded that this updated version "retains much of the flavor in the original with hip production elements added." Howard Cohen from Knight-Ridder Newspapers declared it as a "bouncy remake". David Quantick from NME remarked its "sheer Swedishness".

Music video
Erasure members Vince Clarke and Andy Bell played dual roles – as themselves and in drag (Clarke as Fältskog and Bell as Lyngstad) – in a music video heavily influenced by ABBA's original. It was directed by Philippe Gautier. MC Kinky (aka. Caron Geary), who sings the reggae/dancehall rap part, also appears in an interlude in the video.

Charts

References

External links
 

UK Singles Chart number-one singles
Irish Singles Chart number-one singles
Number-one singles in Austria
Number-one singles in Belgium
Number-one singles in Mexico
European Hot 100 Singles number-one singles
1978 singles
ABBA songs
1992 singles
Erasure songs
A-Teens songs
1999 singles
Songs written by Benny Andersson and Björn Ulvaeus
Polar Music singles
Music videos directed by Lasse Hallström
Alvin and the Chipmunks songs
Atlantic Records singles
Epic Records singles
1978 songs
MC Kinky songs